The YM2203, a.k.a. OPN (FM Operator Type-N), is a six-channel (3 FM and 3 SSG) sound chip developed by Yamaha. It was the progenitor of Yamaha's OPN family of FM synthesis chips used in many video game and computer systems throughout the 1980s and early 1990s.  It was used in a variety of NEC computers, along with various arcade game machines.

The YM2203 and the rest of the OPN synthesizer family generate sound via frequency-modulated digital sine waves.  It included 12 operator "cells", each generating a 13-bit sine wave at a programmable frequency, the volume of which is controlled by a programmable ADSR envelope generator.  The output of these cells could be either summed together by the mixer, or fed into the input of another cell, in 4-cell batches creating the final sound values or "channels". 4 operator cells per channel allowed a total of 8 different permutations of cell connections, known as "algorithms". The ADSR parameters, multiplier and detune settings for each operator, combined with the algorithm, make up what are known as instrument patches.

The YM2203 has the following features:
Three concurrent FM synthesis channels (voices)
Four operators per channel
Two interval timers
Internal implementation of Yamaha's YM2149F SSG chip

The SSG module implemented the YM2149F's three SSG channels, noise generator and dual GPIO ports. The YM2203 is used with a YM3014 external DAC companion chip.

Usage

Arcade games 
 Capcom Commando hardware
 1943
 Black Tiger
 Commando
 Gun.Smoke
 Hyper Dyne Side Arms
 Capcom Bowling
 Ghosts 'n Goblins
 Capcom Bowling
 Legendary Wings
 Hang-On
 Enduro Racer
 Bubble Bobble
 Space Harrier
 Darius
 Puyo Puyo
 The Legend of Kage
 Bomb Jack

Home hardware 
 Fujitsu FM-7 (FM77AV model)
 NEC PC-8801 (PC8801mkII SR models and newer.)
 NEC PC-9801 (PC-9801-26 sound card)

See also 
Yamaha YM2149
Yamaha YM2608, aka OPNA
Yamaha YM2610, aka OPNB
Yamaha YM2612, aka OPN2

References 
YM2203 Datasheet (Translated)

YM2203
Sound chips
Video game music technology